Faine is a surname. Notable people with the surname include:

Jeff Faine (born 1981), American football player
Jon Faine (born 1956), Australian radio presenter
Parker Faine, character in Strangers (Dean Koontz novel)

See also
Haine (surname)
Kaine (surname)